Oron Shaul was an Israeli soldier killed in a high-profile incident during the 2014 Israel–Gaza conflict, whose death first drew international attention when Hamas announced that he had been taken prisoner, and drew international attention again when Hamas demanded the release of prisoners to return the body to the soldier's family.

Battle

During the fighting on July 20, 2014, Hamas fired an anti-tank missile at an IDF armored personnel carrier carrying 7 soldiers, including Oron Shaul.  Hamas rapidly claimed to have captured an IDF soldier named Aron Shaul, backing up its claim with the soldier's "photo ID and credentials". The IDF later confirmed that the body of Oron Shaul had not been identified among the dead found inside the vehicle.

Possible captive
Shaul's fate was the focus of great concern during the short period when it was feared that he had been taken captive, because, according to the Associated Press, "In the past, Israel has paid a heavy price in lopsided prisoner swaps to retrieve captured soldiers or remains held by its enemies." According to The New York Times , "Hamas has recognized the pull such incidents have over the Israeli psyche and clearly has moved to grab hostages.

Palestinian celebration of capture
The claim that an Israeli soldier had been captured, "touched off celebrations among Palestinians in both Gaza and the West Bank", according to The Independent, which ran photos of Palestinians cheering in the streets of Ramallah. According to The New York Times, "Celebrations immediately broke out in Gaza and the West Bank."

Hamas television celebrated the purported kidnapping with a victory mocking the grief of Shaul's family and celebrating the alleged hostage-taking in song: "We've taken a second Shalit, a young, blond-haired boy."

Israel questions claim
By 22 July, spokesmen for Israel questioned the claim of capture.

Confirmation of death
On July 25, Israel confirmed that Shaul was dead.

Ransom demands for soldier's body
On August 11 Israeli Minister of Defense, Moshe Ya'alon visited the Shaul family to inform them that the government was making every effort to retrieve their son's body from Hamas.

There was coverage of the request for Hamas to return the bodies of Shaul and another missing soldier, Hadar Goldin in Israeli and international media through the late summer and early fall of 2014.

The question of whether Israel should release convicted Palestinian militants in exchange for Hamas' agreement to release the bodies of the 2 dead soldiers ignited a heated political debate within Israel. Apparently referring to the 2 bodies, Hamas official Mushir al-Masri boasted that "Hamas has bargaining chips that forced Israel to succumb to Palestinian demands. The indirect negotiations mediated by the Egyptians may in the future lead to a new prisoner swap deal in which many Palestinian prisoners are freed." on his Facebook page.

Ongoing negotiations for the exchange of Palestinian prisoners held in Israel for the bodies of the 2 MIAs have been the focus of international press coverage.

See also
List of kidnappings

References

2014 Israel–Gaza conflict
Israeli military casualties
Kidnapped people
Male murder victims